"You Only Move Twice" is the second episode of the eighth season of the American animated television series The Simpsons. It first aired on the Fox network in the United States on November 3, 1996. The episode, based on a story idea by Greg Daniels, has three major concepts: the family moves to a new town; Homer starts to work for a friendly, sympathetic boss; and that boss, unbeknownst to Homer, is a supervillain. Bart, Lisa, and Marge each have individual secondary storylines. John Swartzwelder wrote the episode, which was directed by Mike B. Anderson.

The episode's title is a reference to the James Bond film You Only Live Twice. Many elements of the episode parody the Bond films, with a character modeled after Bond making a brief appearance. Setting the second and third acts in a new town, Cypress Creek, required the animators to create entirely new layouts and background designs. Albert Brooks, in his fourth appearance on The Simpsons, guest stars as the voice of Hank Scorpio, one of the most popular one-time characters in the entire series. The episode received critical acclaim. IGN named "You Only Move Twice" the best episode of the eighth season and Albert Brooks as one of the best guest stars in the history of the show.

Plot

On his way to work one morning, Smithers is offered a job at the Globex Corporation, but refuses. Being the next-longest tenured employee of the plant, Homer ends up getting the job. He informs his family that the new job pays better, but involves them moving to Cypress Creek. The family originally opposes the move, but they watch a video about the planned community and, seeing that it is much nicer than Springfield, agree to move there. Abandoning their house, the Simpsons pack up and leave town.

After arriving at their new house at 15201 Maple Systems Road, Homer's new boss, Hank Scorpio, introduces himself. Scorpio, who seems like the perfect boss, takes a shine to Homer and makes him chief motivator in the Nuclear division. Meanwhile, Bart starts school, but he soon finds that his new class is far above the standards of Springfield Elementary, and is sent to a remedial class. Lisa goes for a nature walk and discovers that she is allergic to all the wildlife around Cypress Creek. Marge tries to go about her daily chores, but as their new house does everything automatically, she has nothing to do during the day but drink wine and mope.

On Homer's first day at work, Scorpio gives him a tour of the company and listens with interest to his secret dream of owning the Dallas Cowboys football team. He tells Homer that his dream may come true someday. Homer does an excellent job of motivating his team. During a meeting with Homer, Scorpio excuses himself, turns to a screen, threatens the United Nations Security Council by saying they have 72 hours to deliver an unspecified amount of gold and promptly blows up the 59th Street Bridge. Homer remains oblivious to Scorpio's evil genius tendencies, which includes work on a doomsday device and his attempts to kill a spy named "Mr. Bont" with a laser.

At dinner, Homer proudly tells the family how well he is doing at work, but he discovers that they hate Cypress Creek and want to return to Springfield. Dejected, Homer goes to visit Scorpio for advice at the same time that United States Army Special Forces assault Globex HQ. He asks Scorpio what to do and is advised that he should do what's best for his family. Scorpio straps on a flamethrower and holds his ground, while Homer sadly walks away, kicking a grenade in the process. The next day, the family returns to Springfield and Homer receives the Denver Broncos as a present from Scorpio, who has successfully managed to seize the U.S. East Coast.

Production

The episode's original concept came from a story idea by Greg Daniels. The writing staff came up with three major concepts. The first involves the Simpson family moving away from Springfield. The writers initially hoped the audience would be fooled into thinking the move was permanent. As a result, they tried to work in as many characters during the episode's first act to make it seem that the family was really leaving. The second involved Homer getting a new job with an employee-friendly boss—in stark contrast to the tyrannical Mr. Burns. The third was that Homer's new boss would be a supervillain resembling Ernst Stavro Blofeld. This element was meant to be in the background, unbeknownst to Homer.

The writers sought to give every family member their own story. They spent some time arguing over whether to include the depressing idea of Marge becoming an alcoholic in the episode. There was originally another idea involving Grampa Simpson. He is left behind in Springfield and receives recorded greeting phone calls from the family. The plot went on for four sequences, all of which were cut from the episode because of time constraints but were later included in the DVD release. Cypress Creek was called "Emerald Caverns" during most of the production. The name was changed because the writers felt that "Cypress Creek" had more of a "Silicon Valley" feel.

The show's writers did not worry too much about perfecting Scorpio's lines because they knew Albert Brooks, who was voice acting the character, would rewrite or ad lib new ones. Entire sections of Scorpio's dialogue, such as his hammock speech, are Brooks's lines, not the writers'. Dan Castellaneta described how, after he prepared something for Homer to say in response to Brooks's new Scorpio lines, Brooks would deliver totally different lines on the next take. Josh Weinstein said Homer's reactions are exactly like those of someone talking to Albert Brooks. In all, his recordings were over two hours long. Brooks voiced the character Russ Cargill in The Simpsons Movie. For "about a week", he was to reprise the role of Scorpio, but the staff felt that creating a new character was a better idea.

The animators needed to design completely new sets for the episode. Christian Roman, John Reiss and Mike Anderson storyboarded the episode. In the original animatic, Santa's Little Helper and Snowball II were not present, so the animators went back and added them, even though they are not a part of the story. It is a common misconception that Scorpio's design was modeled after Richard Branson. The final design, which underwent an overhaul, was hailed by the writers as "the perfect madman". All the students in Bart's remedial class were initially given hair modeled on Ralph Wiggum's, but the staff felt that the children looked "kinda troubled", so their designs were altered.

Mr. Bont, the man Homer tackles, was initially supposed to be James Bond, but Fox would not let the writers use the name because of concerns over possible lawsuits. They finally decided on "Bont" because it was the most similar name they could legally use.

Cultural references
The final scene at Globex contains several references to action and James Bond films. The episode's title and many references are from the Bond film You Only Live Twice, as well as an allusion to A View to a Kill. Homer tackles and inadvertently helps get a character modeled after Sean Connery's Bond killed, following a parody of the laser scene from Goldfinger. Miss Goodthighs from the 1967 James Bond parody Casino Royale makes an appearance in the episode. She can be seen attacking a character modeled after U.S. Army General Norman Schwarzkopf.

At the beginning of the episode, Waylon Smithers hums "I work for Monty Burns, M-M-M-M-M-M-Monty Burns" to the tune of Hooray for Hollywood.

The sign at the elementary school displays "http://www.studynet.edu". Weinstein called it "one of the show's most obviously dated jokes" because the idea of a school having its own website was almost a novelty in 1996.

The song at the end of the show, written by Ken Keeler, is a parody of various Bond themes. Keeler originally wrote it to be three seconds longer and sound more like the Goldfinger theme, but the final version was shorter and the lyrics were sped up. The writers wanted the song to be sung by Shirley Bassey, who sang several Bond themes, but they could not get her to record the part.

Homer's disappointment at being given the Denver Broncos in lieu of the Dallas Cowboys was a reference to the Cowboys' success at the time. When the episode was aired, the Cowboys had won a then-record five Super Bowls and were the defending Super Bowl champions while the Broncos had yet to win a league title; moreover, the American Football Conference of which the Broncos were part had not won the Super Bowl since the 1983 season. Ironically, in real life the Broncos have been the far more successful team since the episode was aired, appearing in four Super Bowls and winning three. In contrast, the Cowboys have not appeared in the Super Bowl since 1996. Since Homer Simpson took "ownership" of the Broncos in this episode, as of January 2023, the team has not lost to the Dallas Cowboys. In the seven games that the two teams have played since this episode aired, the Broncos are 7-0, outscoring the Cowboys by a combined score of 232-159.

Reception

After its original broadcast, "You Only Move Twice" finished 50th in the Nielsen ratings for the week of October 28 – November 3, 1996, with a rating of 8.5, equivalent to approximately 8.2 million viewing households. It was the second highest-rated show on the Fox network that week, following The X-Files.

In 2006, IGN named Brooks The Simpsons best guest star citing Scorpio as his best role. The Phoenix.com also placed Brooks at the top of their best guest voices list of Simpsons characters. In his book Planet Simpson, author Chris Turner says Brooks is second only to Phil Hartman among the show's guest stars writing that he "brings hilarious satirical seamlessness to Scorpio's paradoxical nature". He believes the delivery of Scorpio's final line—"But Homer, on your way out if you wanna kill somebody, it would help me a lot."—seals Brooks's place in The Simpsons history. The Simpson family's new street address, 15201 Maple Systems Road, is writer Ken Keeler's favorite street name in the show.

IGN also picked the episode as the best of the eighth season, saying it "is a wonderful example of slowly building up the comedy  it's impossible to fathom this one not being very high up on any list of the best Simpsons episodes of all time." Reviewer Robert Canning gave the episode a "Masterful" score of ten out of ten, saying the episode "may well be the greatest Simpsons episode of all time". Warren Martyn and Adrian Wood, authors of the book I Can't Believe It's a Bigger and Better Updated Unofficial Simpsons Guide, called it "a tremendous episode" saying it has "some really good moments, most of them involving Bart, Lisa, and Marge's loathing for Cypress Creek. The remedial kids are fab (especially Warren), and Lisa's second chipmunk encounter is inspired. Scorpio is a good character, especially his Christopher Walken-esque killing spree." They named the owl grabbing the chipmunk during Lisa's trip to the forest one of the greatest sight gags in the show's history. Chris Turner also felt that the remedial boy Gordy's line may be "the broadest parody of a Canadian accent in the history of American pop culture". Ben Rayner of the Toronto Star included "You Only Move Twice" on his list of the best episodes of The Simpsons. In his review of The Complete Eighth Season DVD set, Raul Burriel described it as one of the "most clever episodes the series has ever given us". Entertainment.ie named it among the 10 greatest Simpsons episodes of all time. In 2019, Consequence of Sound ranked it number seven on its list of top 30 Simpsons episodes. In 2020, Al Jean acknowledged "You Only Move Twice" as an episode many consider to be a favorite.

References

Bibliography

External links

 
 

1996 American television episodes
The Simpsons (season 8) episodes
Television shows written by John Swartzwelder
Denver Broncos
Parody television episodes
James Bond parodies